Jammi can refer to the city or the medical journal.

Jammi (also Romanized as Jammī, Jamī, and Jammey) is a village in Baba Aman Rural District, in the Central District of Bojnord County, North Khorasan Province, Iran. At the 2006 census, its population was 1,755, in 397 families.

JAMMI (Journal of the Association of Medical Microbiology and Infectious Disease Canada)
http://www.pulsus.com/journals/journalHome.jsp?jnlKy=20&HCtype=Consumer

References 

Populated places in Bojnord County